Alfred Dayton Oliphant (October 28, 1887 – June 25, 1963) was a Justice of the New Jersey Supreme Court from 1945 to 1946, and again from 1948 to 1957.

Biography
Oliphant was born in Trenton, New Jersey on October 28, 1887, the son of Civil War General Samuel Duncan Oliphant and Elizabeth Van Dever (Dayton) Oliphant.

After graduating from the Lawrenceville School, he received his BA from Princeton University and his Juris Doctor (J.D.) University of Pennsylvania. He married Marguerite A. Broughton on June 21, 1924.

Oliphant was a Republican member of New Jersey General Assembly from Mercer County from 1915 to 1917 and Mercer County Prosecutor of the Pleas from 1918 to 1923.

Oliphant was circuit judge for Hudson, Middlesex and Mercer counties from 1927 to 1945. He was an associate justice of New Jersey Supreme Court, 1945–46 and again from 1948 to 1957. He served as Chancellor of New Jersey Court of Chancery from 1946 to 1948 during the rewriting of the Constitution of New Jersey and the reorganization of the state court system.

He died on June 25, 1963, in Princeton, New Jersey. He was interred in Riverview Cemetery in Trenton.

See also
List of justices of the Supreme Court of New Jersey
New Jersey Court of Errors and Appeals
Courts of New Jersey

References

1887 births
1963 deaths
Lawrenceville School alumni
Republican Party members of the New Jersey General Assembly
New Jersey lawyers
Justices of the Supreme Court of New Jersey
Politicians from Trenton, New Jersey
People from Princeton, New Jersey
University of Pennsylvania Law School alumni
Princeton University alumni
20th-century American judges
20th-century American politicians
20th-century American lawyers